F. Leonard Wailes Law Office is a historic building located at Salisbury, Wicomico County, Maryland.  It was constructed in 1927 in the Colonial Revival style. It is a two-story brick building opposite the Wicomico County Courthouse in a line of early- to mid-20th century commercial buildings.

It was listed on the National Register of Historic Places in 1997.

References

External links

, including photo from 1995, at Maryland Historical Trust

Commercial buildings on the National Register of Historic Places in Maryland
Buildings and structures in Salisbury, Maryland
Colonial Revival architecture in Maryland
Commercial buildings completed in 1927
National Register of Historic Places in Wicomico County, Maryland
Law offices
Legal history of Maryland